Lōmāfānu (or loamaafaanu) are Maldivian texts in the form of copper plates on which inscriptions have been added. Many new Maldivian historical texts are found only in lōmāfānu form, with the oldest of the plates dating from the twelfth century AD. The Divehi script used on the plates was named "Eveyla Akuru" by H. C. P. Bell, who claimed that it resembled medieval Sinhala script.

According to the Isdū Lōmāfānu, monks from monasteries of the southern atoll of Haddhunmathi were brought to Malé and beheaded. Besides the lōmāfānu plates found in Haddhunmathi Atoll, one of the most important Maldivian copper plates is the Bodugalu Miskiy Lōmāfānu found in Malé.

See also
Dhivehi writing systems
Haddhunmathi Atoll
Isdhoo (Laamu Atoll)
Dhanbidhoo (Laamu Atoll)

References
Ali Najeeb, Dambidū Lōmāfānu. Council for Linguistic and Historical Research. Malé 2001.
HCP Bell, The Maldive islands. Monograph on the History, Archaeology and Epigraphy. Reprint 1940 edn. Malé 1986.
Bodufenvahuge Sidi. Divehi Akuru; Evvana Bai. Malé 1958.
H.A. Maniku & G.D. Wijayawardhana, Isdhoo Loamaafaanu, Colombo 1986.
Romero-Frias, Xavier. The Maldive Islanders, A Study of the Popular Culture of an Ancient Ocean Kingdom. Barcelona 1999.

History of the Maldives